Scott McDonald (born 1983) is an Australian footballer.

Scott McDonald or Scott MacDonald may also refer to:

 Scott MacDonald (musician), member the Canadian band Spoons
 Scott MacDonald (actor) (born 1959), American actor
 Scott McDonald (curler) (born 1986), Canadian curler
 Scott McDonald (CEO) (born 1967), chief executive officer of Oliver Wyman
 Scott McDonald (athletic director), director of athletics for the University of Louisiana at Monroe